Lonchocarpus retiferus is a species of legume in the family Fabaceae.
It is found in Honduras and Nicaragua.

References

retiferus
Flora of Honduras
Flora of Nicaragua
Endangered plants
Taxonomy articles created by Polbot